JSS Dental College & Hospital (JSSDCH) is a dental institutions in Southern Karnataka, India and was established in 1986-87 at Mysuru.It offers the Bachelor of Dental Surgery (B.D.S) and Master of Dental Surgery (M.D.S) degrees. The college's graduate and post-graduate programs are recognized by the Dental Council of India and Government of India. In 2008 it affiliated with Jagadguru Sri Shivarathreeshwara University (JSS University). It had been affiliated to the Rajiv Gandhi University of Health Sciences, Karnataka from 1996 and it was affiliated to the University of Mysore from 1986. The college is located in a JSS Medical Institutions Campus spread across over 38 acres. 5 acres is exclusively demarcated for the Dental College.

Undergraduate Courses 
The college offers a four year B.D.S course with a one year compulsory rotating internship. The seats are filled through NEET UG conducted by National Testing Agency (NTA)

Specialties offered in M.D.S 
Oral Pathology and Microbiology 
Community dentistry
Conservative dentistry & Endodontics
Oral medicine & Radiology
Oral and maxillofacial surgery
Orthodontics
Pedodontics & Preventive Dentistry
Periodontics
Prosthodontics

Library & Information Centre
The library is equipped with books, periodicals and academic papers and online access.

Smile Trainee Program 
Since March 2002, 40 children with cleft lip and palate were operated at JSS Hospital offers complete rehabilitation facilities for these children. The JSS Dental College & Hospital treats the accompanying dental problems and works in conjunction with JSS Medical College and JSS Institute of Speech and Hearing for multidisciplinary  management.

Dental colleges in Karnataka
Universities and colleges in Mysore
1986 establishments in Karnataka
Educational institutions established in 1986